Paul Yoon (born 1980) is an American fiction writer. In 2010 The National Book Foundation named him a 5 Under 35 honoree.

Early life and education
Yoon's grandfather was a North Korean refugee who resettled in South Korea, where he later founded an orphanage. Yoon graduated from Phillips Exeter Academy in 1998 and Wesleyan University in 2002.

Career
His first book, Once the Shore, was selected as a New York Times Notable Book; a Los Angeles Times, San Francisco Chronicle, Publishers Weekly, and Minneapolis Star Tribune Best Book of the Year; and a National Public Radio Best Debut of the Year. His work has appeared in the PEN/O. Henry Prize Stories collection, and he is the recipient of a 5 under 35 Award from the National Book Foundation. His novel, Snow Hunters, won the 2014 New York Public Library Young Lions Fiction Award.

Recently a part of the faculty of the Bennington Writing Seminars, Yoon is now a Briggs-Copeland lecturer at Harvard University.

Personal life
Yoon lives in Cambridge, Massachusetts with his wife, Laura van den Berg.

Bibliography

Novels
 2013: Snow Hunters 
 2020: Run Me to Earth

Short story collections
 2009: Once the Shore 
 2017: The Mountain

References

1980 births
Living people
American people of North Korean descent
American short story writers
American writers of Korean descent
Writers from New York City
Phillips Exeter Academy alumni
Wesleyan University alumni
Harvard University faculty